Anopinella yangana is a species of moth of the family Tortricidae. It is found in Ecuador.

The wingspan is about 19 mm.

External links
Tortricidae (Lepidoptera) from the Mountains of Ecuador and remarks on their geographical distribution. Part IV: Eastern Cordillera

Anopinella
Moths described in 2009
Moths of South America
Taxa named by Józef Razowski